Laurence Henry Cristine De Bock (born 7 November 1992), known as Laurens De Bock, is a Belgian professional footballer who plays as a left-back for Super League Greece club Atromitos.

He has represented Belgium at various youth levels including Belgium U21s. He has been named in the Belgium national team but remains uncapped.

Club career

Early career
De Bock joined HO Kalken in his youth. After three years, the defender made the switch to the neighboring Standaard Wetteren, where he was discovered at the age of 11 by scouts of KSC Lokeren. De Bock combined football with his studies at the top sports school in Ghent.

KSC Lokeren
After coming through the Lokeren youth set up, manager Georges Leekens brought then 16-year-old De Bock to the first team squad. In the 2009–10 season, in the first match of the play-offs, De Bock made his debut at the highest level under manager Emilio Ferrera. During the 2011–12 season he won the Belgian Cup.

Club Brugge
After being linked with Anderlecht, on 5 January, De Bock joined Club Brugge, where he signed a contract until the end of the 2017 season, for a transfer fee of €3.5 million. He won the Belgian Cup with Brugge during the 2014–15 season and followed this up by winning the Belgian Pro League in the 2015–16 season and then the Belgian Super Cup in 2016.

Leeds United
On 11 January 2018, De Bock signed for Championship club Leeds United on a four-and-a-half-year contract. De Bock was handed the number 12 shirt. He made his debut for Leeds on 20 January 2018 in a dramatic 4–3 loss against Millwall.

De Bock featured in seven games, including having a 'tough game' against Derby County, before losing his starting place to 19-year-old Tom Pearce.

Loan to Oostende
After falling behind left backs Barry Douglas, Leif Davis and Tom Pearce in the pecking order under new head coach Marcelo Bielsa for the start of the 2018–19 season, on 21 August 2018, De Bock joined Belgian First Division A side Oostende on a season-long loan. De Bock revealed that he had turned down a loan move to Israeli Premier League side Beitar Jerusalem F.C. to join K.V. Oostende.

In total, he made 20 appearances scoring 1 goal for K.V. Oostende in Belgian First Division A.

Loan to Sunderland
On 2 September 2019, De Bock signed for Sunderland on a season-long loan. He made his league debut for the club on 28 September in their 2–1 defeat of Milton Keynes Dons.

Loan to ADO Den Haag
On 13 January 2020, De Bock joined Eredivisie club ADO Den Haag on loan until the end of the season.

Loan to Zulte Waregem
He joined Zulte Waregem on a season-long loan in July 2020. He subsequently rejoined Zulte Waregem on a fresh season-long loan agreement in July 2021.

Having not made an appearance for Leeds since January 2018, De Bock's time with the Yorkshire club concluded in June 2022 with the end of his contract.

Atromitos F.C.
De Bock signed for Greek Super League team Atromitos in the summer of 2022.

Zulte Waregem
It was announced on 20 May 2022 that De Bock had signed a permanent 1 year deal for the 2022-23 season with Zulte Waregem, with the option of a further year.

Atromitos
On 30 July 2022, De Bock signed a two-year contract with Atromitos in Greece, moving on a free transfer.

International career
De Bock has represented Belgium at various age levels including Under 21.

In November 2014, De Bock was named in the Belgium squad for a friendly against Romania, however was unused. In November 2014 De Bock was recalled into the senior Belgium squad as injury cover for Vincent Kompany in their UEFA Euro 2016 qualifier against Wales, and was called up again in March 2015.

Career statistics

Honours
KSC Lokeren
 Belgian Cup: 2011–12

Club Brugge
 Belgian First Division: 2015–16
 Belgian Cup: 2014–15
 Belgian Super Cup: 2016

References

External links

 

1992 births
Living people
Belgian footballers
Belgium youth international footballers
Belgium under-21 international footballers
Association football defenders
K.S.C. Lokeren Oost-Vlaanderen players
Club Brugge KV players
Leeds United F.C. players
K.V. Oostende players
Sunderland A.F.C. players
ADO Den Haag players
S.V. Zulte Waregem players
Atromitos F.C. players
Belgian Pro League players
English Football League players
Eredivisie players
Super League Greece players
People from Dendermonde
Footballers from East Flanders
Belgian expatriate footballers
Belgian expatriate sportspeople in England
Belgian expatriate sportspeople in the Netherlands
Belgian expatriate sportspeople in Greece
Expatriate footballers in England
Expatriate footballers in the Netherlands
Expatriate footballers in Greece